New Burlington may refer to:
New Burlington, Indiana
New Burlington, Clinton County, Ohio, a former village
New Burlington, Hamilton County, Ohio, a census-designated place
New Burlington: The Life and Death of an American Village, a non-fiction book by John Baskin